Rosa Pavanelli is the General Secretary of Public Services International, the global union federation for public sector trade unions.

Early life
Pavanelli was born in 1955 in Brescia, Italy. She holds a degree in biology from the State University of Milan.

Trade unions
Pavanelli started her trade union activity in 1978 while working with the Ministry of Labour in Brescia. In 1986 she became a member of the secretariat of the trade union Public Function, responsible for the municipal sector, and then for the healthcare sector.  She later worked full-time for Italian General Confederation of Labour, becoming regional General Secretary in 1999, and later President of the public sector branch of CGIL. She has also served as Vice President of the European Public Service Union Federation in 2009, and PSI Vice President for the European Region.

In March 2016, Pavanelli was appointed by United Nations Secretary-General Ban Ki-moon to the High-Level Commission on Health Employment and Economic Growth, which was co-chaired by presidents François Hollande of France and Jacob Zuma of South Africa.

References

1955 births
Living people
People from Brescia
University of Milan alumni